Webbed toes is the informal and common name for syndactyly affecting the feet—the fusion of two or more digits of the feet. This is normal in many birds, such as ducks; amphibians, such as frogs; and some mammals, such as kangaroos. In humans it is rare, occurring once in about 2,000 to 2,500 live births: most commonly the second and third toes are webbed (joined by skin and flexible tissue), which can reach partly or almost fully up the toe.

Cause 
The exact cause of the condition is unknown. In some cases, close family members may share this condition.  In other cases, no other related persons have this condition.  The scientific name for the condition is syndactyly, although this term covers both webbed fingers and webbed toes. Syndactyly occurs when apoptosis or programmed cell death during gestation is absent or incomplete. Webbed toes occur most commonly in the following circumstances:
 Syndactyly or familial syndactyly
 Down syndrome

It is also associated with a number of rare conditions, notably:
 Aarskog–Scott syndrome
 Acrocallosal syndrome
 Apert syndrome
 Bardet–Biedl syndrome
 Carpenter syndrome
 Cornelia de Lange syndrome
 Edwards syndrome
 Jackson–Weiss syndrome
 Fetal hydantoin syndrome
 Miller syndrome
 Pfeiffer syndrome
 Smith–Lemli–Opitz syndrome
 Timothy syndrome
 Ectodermal dysplasia
 Klippel–Feil syndrome

Diagnosis 
This condition is normally discovered at birth. If other symptoms are present, a specific syndrome may be indicated. Diagnosis of a specific syndrome is based on family history, medical history, and a physical exam. Webbed toes are also known as "twin toes," "duck toes," "turkey toes", "tree toes" and "tiger toes."

Severity can vary. Most cases involve the second and third toes but any number of toes can be involved. In some cases the toes are joined part way while in some the webbing can extend right up to the nails. In some cases the entire toes, including the nails and bones, can be fused.

Treatment 

Webbed toes can be separated through surgery. Surgical separation of webbed toes is an example of body modification.

As with any form of surgery, there are risks of complications. In contrast, when left untreated it is very uncommon for webbed toes to cause complications beyond cosmetic considerations. For this reason, many medical professionals do not recommend surgical separation for typical cases. 

The end results depend on the extent of the webbing and underlying bone structure. There is usually some degree of scarring, and skin grafts may be required. In rare instances, nerve damage may lead to loss of feeling in the toes and a tingling sensation. There are also reports of partial web grow-back.  The skin grafts needed to fill in the space between the toes can lead to additional scars in the places where the skin is removed.

Notable cases 
 Dan Aykroyd – Canada, actor
 Tricia Helfer – Canada, actress
 Jacqui Hurley – Ireland, sports broadcaster
 Ashton Kutcher – United States, actor
 Thomas Robert Malthus – England, political economist and demographer 
 Danielle Panabaker – United States, actress
 Conan O'Brien – United States, comedian 
 Joseph Stalin – Soviet Union, General Secretary of the Communist Party of the Soviet Union

See also
 Webbed foot
 Bird feet and legs – webbing and lobation

References

External links 

Congenital disorders of musculoskeletal system
Toes